Thomas Kenna (born 1893) was an Irish hurler who played for the Tipperary senior team.

Kenna joined the team during the 1906 championship and was a regular member of the starting fifteen until his retirement after the 1908 championship. During that time he won two All-Ireland medals and one Munster medal.

At club level Kenna won numerous county championship medals with Thurles Sarsfields.

References

1893 births
Thurles Sarsfields hurlers
Tipperary inter-county hurlers
All-Ireland Senior Hurling Championship winners
Year of death missing